"Kiss of Life" is a song by Australian singer-songwriter Kylie Minogue and English singer-songwriter Jessie Ware. The song was released on 29 October 2021 as the second single from Disco: Guest List Edition, the reissue of Minogue's fifteenth studio album Disco (2020).

Background and release
In September 2020, Minogue appeared on Ware's Table Manners podcast co-hosted with Ware’s mother Lennie. In the episode, the pair spoke about writing together. Ware later joked that she'd "bullied" Minogue into a duet as the two further discussed a collaboration.

On 5 October 2021, Minogue announced the forthcoming reissue of Disco and revealed that the album's tracklist, including "Kiss of Life".

Production and composition
"Kiss of Life" is written by Minogue, Ware, Danny Parker, Shungudzo and James Ford, with the latter also handling the track's production and mixing. Ware is a frequent collaborator with Ford, Parker and Shungudzo, with all having credits on her fourth studio album What's Your Pleasure? (2020). The song was recorded in London, with Minogue recording her vocals remotely in Melbourne.

Music video
The music video for "Kiss of Life" premiered on YouTube at 6pm GMT on 4 November 2021. Directed by Sophie Muller, the video was shot in London's Ave Mario restaurant and features both Minogue and Ware, alongside dancers from the Theo Adams Company and Princess Julia. The video is inspired by the works of Pedro Almodóvar and 1980s telenovela. The video incorporates elements of farce, with Ware appearing as a busy restaurateur and Minogue as a troublesome diner wreaking havoc among the guests.

Ware is dressed in Saint Laurent, while Minogue first appears on screen wearing Valentino haute couture and later wears Saint Laurent. Remarking on the video's bold fashion and comedic themes, W writer Kyle Munzenrieder described it as a "high fashion fantasy version of Looney Tunes" and a "designer clothing-filled camp fest".

Live performances
On 13 November 2021, Minogue and Ware performed "Kiss of Life" together for the first time on The Jonathan Ross Show. Ware performed her What's Your Pleasure? tour at O2 Academy Brixton on 28 May 2022, the same day as Minogue's 54th birthday, and Minogue was brought out as a special guest for a performance of "Kiss of Life".

Charts

Release history

References

External links

2021 singles
2021 songs
Kylie Minogue songs
Jessie Ware songs
BMG Rights Management singles
Songs written by Kylie Minogue
Songs written by Jessie Ware
Songs written by James Ford (musician)
Songs written by Danny Parker (songwriter)
Songs written by Shungudzo